Rob Williams is a British screenwriter and producer, best known for the BBC1 crime drama The Victim.

Career
Prior to his career in screenwriting, Williams worked in publishing. In 2008, he was awarded a place on the BBC Writer's Academy, a programme designed to train new writers for their long running television series. He went on to write for all four of the BBC's popular continuing dramas: Doctors, EastEnders, Casualty and its spinoff, Holby City. Williams also wrote episodes of Killing Eve, The Man in the High Castle and DCI Banks.

In 2014, ITV broadcast Williams' thriller Chasing Shadows. The series follows a missing persons unit, and stars Reece Shearsmith as Sean Stone, a detective Sergeant, and Alex Kingston. The series of four episodes concluded on 25 September 2014.

In 2019, his four-part thriller miniseries The Victim, produced by STV Studios, was broadcast on BBC One. It starred Kelly Macdonald, James Harkness and John Hannah, in a story about a murdered child's mother going on trial for inciting murder after she is accused of posting online the new identity and address of the man she believes murdered her son. Williams teamed again with STV on prison drama Screw, which broadcast on Channel 4 in January 2022. Williams was the showrunner of Suspicion, which streamed on Apple TV+ on 4 February 2022. It is based on the Israeli series False Flag.

References

External links
 

Living people
Year of birth missing (living people)
21st-century British male writers
British television writers
British male screenwriters
British soap opera writers
British television producers